Indigenous Mexican Americans or Mexican American Indians are American citizens who are descended from the indigenous peoples of Mexico. Indigenous Mexican-Americans usually speak an Indigenous language as their first language and may not speak either Spanish or English. Indigenous Mexican-Americans may or may not identify as "Hispanic" or "Latino". While some identify as Mexican and Indigenous, others instead solely identify with their Indigenous nation/community/culture.

Demographics
California is home to a large and growing population of Indigenous people of Mexican birth or descent. 200,000 people in the state are descended from one or more of Mexico's over 60 Indigenous groups.  Many of these Indigenous Mexican-Americans hail from the indigenous people of Oaxaca, with California being home to between 100,000 and 150,000 indigenous Oaxacans. 50,000 are estimated to be Mixtec, an indigenous people from the La Mixteca region of Western Oaxaca and nearby portions of Puebla and Guerrero.

Discrimination

Most Mexicans identify as Mestizo, have very large amounts of Indigenous ancestry, are of Amerindian phenotypes/race, but are culturally assimilated to Latin European ideologies such as mestizaje and therefore do not identify as culturally or politically Indigenous peoples of Mexico. They are generally not part of an Indigenous community, and do not have the same experiences as people who are culturally and politically Indigenous. There is both cultural mestizaje, which includes people of colour of any race who are not culturally indigenous, and there is racial mestizaje which generally means someone is mixed race of both Indigenous and European ancestry. 

Within cultural mestizaje there is anti-Amerindian racism based on phenotypes, which affects both culturally Indigenous and culturally Mestizo people who are visibly mono-racially Amerindian, and there is also ethnicity-based discrimination in which cultural Mestizos of all phenotypes discriminate against people who are culturally Indigenous (unassimilated). Amerindian race and being culturally Indigenous are often conflated. While they are not mutually exclusive and certainly do overlap a lot, being racially Amerindian does not automatically make someone culturally or politically Indigenous, and while most Indigenous peoples of the Americas are racialized as Amerindian, there are valid culturally Indigenous people of the Americas who present as other races (white, black or Asian) due to Amerindian tribes mixing with and adopting people from the Eastern Hemisphere post-contact.

The slur "Oaxaquita" ("Little Oaxacan") is sometimes used as a derogatory term that is used by Spanish-speaking Mexican-Americans against Indigenous Mexican-Americans. The term carries the connotation that being from Oaxaca is negative and is often used against any Mexican-American who is short or fat. The slur "indito" ("little Indian") is also used against Indigenous Oaxacans. Indigenous Mexican-Americans have been subjected to ridicule, derision, stereotyping, teasing, bullying, and other forms of discrimination and abuse by non-Indigenous Mexican-Americans. Dynamics of racism and discrimination that exist within Mexico also exist within Mexican-American immigrant communities.

Discrimination against indigenous Oaxacan and Mixtec people can also come from Mexican-Americans who, although also coming from an Indigenous Mexican background, have stopped speaking a Mixtecan or other Indigenous language. Those who have assimilated by adopting the Spanish or English languages may look down upon Indigenous people who have preserved their language and culture.

In clandestinely recorded audio leaked to the public, erstwhile president of the Los Angeles City Council Nury Martinez, a mestiza, mocked the Oaxacan community in Koreatown, saying "I see a lot of little short dark people there," whom she described as ugly. She stepped down from her position as city council president and faced wide calls to resign from the city council.

Notable people 

 Elisa Marina Alvarado, actress, educator
 James Anaya, lawyer
 Roy Benavidez (1935-1998), Medal of Honor recipient
 Silvester Brito (1937-2018), poet
 Abel Fernandez (1930-2016), actor
 José M. Hernández (b. 1962), astronaut, engineer
 George Lopez (b. 1961), comedian

 Xiuhtezcatl Martinez (b. 2000), environmental activist, hip hop artist
 Alex Meraz (b. 1985)
 Marty Perez (b. 1946)
 Emiliano Reyes (b. 1984)
 John Romero (b. 1967)
 Mariee Sioux (b. 1985)
 Selena (1971-1995), singer, songwriter
 Xiye Bastida (b. 2002), environmental activist

See also

Academia Semillas del Pueblo
Ballet Folklorico Aztlan
Casa Dolores
Danza Mexi'cayotl
Genízaro
Hayandose
Mexican Kickapoo
Mexicayotl
Mixtec transnational migration
Pelota mixteca

References

External links
Binational Center for the Development of Oaxacan Indigenous Communities official website

 
Mixtec